The Yaminawá (Iaminaua, Jaminawa, Yawanawa) are an indigenous people who live in Acre (Brazil), Madre de Dios (Peru) and Pando (Bolivia). Their homeland is Acre, Brazil.

Name
The Yaminawá translated to "people of the axe." They are also called the Iaminaua, Jaminawa, Yaminawá (in Brazil), and Yaminahua (in Peru and Bolívia), as well as  Yuminahua, Yabinahua, Yambinahua, Yamanawa, and other variants. The Yaminawá name was given to them by outsiders. They have several autonyms including Bashonawá (basho = "opossum"), Marinawá (mari = "cutia", an agouti), Xixinawá (xixi = "white coati"), or Yawanawá (yawa = "wild boar").

Language
The Yaminawá language belongs to the Panoan language family. Linguists estimate that less than 1600 people speak the language. Its ISO 639-3 code is YAA. Very few Yaminawá people speak Spanish or Portuguese, and their literacy rate is extremely low.

Current affairs
The Yawanawa community is currently led by Tashka and Laura Yawanawa. Tashka Yawanawa had served as Chief of the Yananawa since 2001. In just a few years, Tashka and his wife Laura (Mixteca-Zapoteca) have worked to increase Yawanawa territory, reinvigorate Yawanawa culture, and establish economically and socially empowering relationships with the outside world.

The Yawanawa community and their allies are developing a new model of sustainability that allows the Yawanawa to protect the rainforest and engage with the outside world on their own terms, without losing their cultural and spiritual identity.

References

Further reading
 Yaminawá in the Encyclopedia of Indigenous Peoples in Brazil
 Video of Yaminawa mourning songs

Ethnic groups in Brazil
Indigenous peoples in Brazil
Indigenous peoples in Peru
Indigenous peoples in Bolivia
Indigenous peoples of the Amazon

it:Yawanawá
mk:Јаванава
pt:Iauanauás